Kabi Samrata Upendra Bhanja was a 17th-century Odia poet-composer of classical Odissi music. He is most known for his Odissi songs and kabyas written in the Odia language, primarily Baidehisa Bilasa, Labanyabati & Koti Brahmanda Sundari.

He was born during 1670 (opinions differ between 1670 and 1688) in Kulagarh, Ghumusar zamindari, present day Kulada near Bhanjanagar, 80 kms from the Silk City Brahmapur, Odisha and died during 1740 (again opinions vary).

His first wife was the sister of the king of Nayagarh and the daughter of the king of Banapur was his second wife, who was an erudite princess and gave Upendra Bhanja poetical inspiration in an abundant measure. His grandfather King Dhananjaya Bhanja was a great poet and wrote Raghunatha Bilasa (The Ramayana), Ratna Manjari (a poetical romance) etc., which provided models to the prince for writing. But unlike his grandfather, he preferred his entire life to poetry rather than to ruling over a kingdom. He had a thorough training in Sanskrit classical literature and mastered Sanskrit dictionaries such as Amara Kosha, Trikanda Kosha and Medini Kosha. He even wrote a dictionary Geetabhidhana in Odia for helping poets. The town of  Bhanjanagar is named after him. The music of Upendra Bhanja is central to Odissi music, the traditional classical music of the state of Odisha and Bhanja is widely respected as one of the greatest Odissi composers of all time.

Kabyas
Upendra Bhanja wrote some 52 books of which only 22 are available now. Due to the absence of a printing press, many of the hand-copied books have been lost. Some of his eminent kabyas are Baidehisha Bilasa (with "Ba" initial for each line), Rasalila, Brajaleela, Subhadra Parinaya(with "Sa" initial for every line), Labanyabati, Premasudhanidhi, Rasika Harabali, Subhadra Parinaya and Chitrakabya Bandodhya, Labanyabati, Koti Brahmanda Sundari, Kala Koutuka (with "Ka" initial for every line), Satisha Bilasa" (with initial 'Sa' initial every line), "Damayanti Bilasa" (with 'Da' initial each line) and "Padmabati Parinaya" (starts with 'Pa') etc.

The first published work of Upendra Bhanja is "Rasapanchaka". The first dictionary "Gita Abidhan" was written by Upendra Bhanja in Odia literature. 'Kabi Samrata' was not the first title of Upendra Bhanja. He was rather entitled as "Birabara" as written by Bhanja himself in his kabyas.  
The epithet Kabi Samrata is found only in the early part of 19th century in a book written by Mahendra Patnaik. Upendra Bhanja contributed 32,300 words to Odia language and literature.The obscurity of this incomparable poet of Odia literature, may be attributed to the lack of proper research. Plot and character in Bhanja literature plays negligible role but imaginary ornamental expression by way of literary techniques of the classical Indian literature dominates with magnetic, lovable, intellectual manner.

So, study of Upendra Bhanja requires high academic pursuits as well as sensible appreciation of art and literary value of the reader along with wide study range in the field of classical Indian literature and appreciable order of morality and spiritual thought. So for Upendra Bhanja, plot and character are not important but momentous feeling influences the character as well as the plot in the structural poetic forms and techniques with explosive reason and emotion in a way of synthetic, stylistic approach in almost all aspects of his expression through Odia language, literature, culture, socio-cultural behaviour, with high moral order and thoughts of superior human being.

On the other hand, his writings are being popularised by the commoners because of sensible, emotional touch with sympathetic unusual feelings of the human kind in the context of aesthetic sense and sensibility along with love and lovability of the mankind as experienced through the ages of time together.Strangely, without any deep appreciation of human value and literary appreciation with standard principles of study literature as prescribed in the research methodology and literary criticism with reference to classical Indian poetics, the poet Upendra Bhanja is being misunderstood by some pseudo critics/scholars and writers with biased opinions and unscrupulous baseless manners.

The first Ph.D thesis on Bhanja was submitted by Dr. Satyanarayan Acharya, the First Researcher on Upendra Bhanja, in the year 1978 under UGC sponsorship. Consequently, in the year 1988 Dr. Abhimanyu Baral submitted the thesis "Odia reetikabya paramparare Baidehisha Bilasa" to Utkal University, Bhubaneswar.

Music

The works of Upendra Bhanja are based on Odissi classical music. He uses ragas and talas unique to the Odissi tradition and has thereby enriched the repertoire. His compositions are well-known across the state of Odisha and are frequently employed in Odissi dance as well as Gotipua, Sakhi Nata, Prahallada Nataka, Radha Prema Lila and other allied artforms. Some of the ragas frequently used by Bhanja are : Bangalasri, Baradi, Basanta, Basanta Baradi, Bibhasa Gujjari, Chinta Bhairaba, Ghantaraba, Kalahansa Kedara, Kali, Kamodi, Khanda Kamodi, Kousika, Kumbha Kamodi, Malaba, Mangala Baradi, Mangala Gujjari, Natanarayana, Nalinigouda, Pahadia Kedara, Panchama Baradi, Pattaha Manjari (Pattamanjari), Rajabije (Ranabije), Ramakeri, Sankarabharana, Soka Kamodi among others. Bhanja belonged to a family that was rooted in literature and music of the times, and his grandfather Dhananjaya Bhanja was an eminent composer of Odissi songs and the writer of a Ramayana kabya.

Style
Upendra Bhanja wrote in the last decade of seventeenth and the early decades of eighteenth century and championed a style of poetry called 'Reeti' and 'Deena' in Sanskrit poetics. Though many poets in the seventeenth and eighteenth centaurs write in reeti style, Upendra Bhanja is decided by the greatest of them all. Whether it is shringara, viraha, bhakti or karuna rasa, Upendra Bhanja is the poet of unsurpassed rhetorical excellence. We may venture to say that, apart from Sanskrit, no other language has a poet to compare with him. Upendra Bhanja had practiced his great poetic talents in using "upama","alankara", "rasas"in all his kabyas.

The greatness of Upendra Bhanja was in his "Alankara" use such as: Anuprasa, Jamak, etc. The style of presenting facts with comparable factors (upama) is very distinguishable in his

“Baidehisha Bilasa” is the pioneer work of Upendra Bhanja as declared by the poet."Rasika Harabali" was written on the basis of his own experience at the early part of his young life.His contemporary  poet  of Bhakta Kabi, Dina Krushna Das as described in his work “Kala Koutuka”. The socio-cultural way of contemporary Odias are vividly described in his literature .Upendra  Bhanja is not only eminent poet of Odisha but also his writings will be explained through  all classical contemporary music systems of India

Controversy
Upendra Bhanja had a poetic excellence and he has written all his Kabyas as the rules of Alankarshastra of that time, but his kabyas have made some critiques irritated for the sexuality he used in his imagery descriptions. During the beginning of modern period or age of Radhanath, Upendra Bhanja was criticised by some modernist for the obscenity in his kabyas. There was a war of words between two literary periodicals The Indradhanu and The Bijuli. The two periodicals kept their support in favour of two poets Kabisamrat Upendra Bhanja and Radhanath Ray. It was also a war between conservatives and modernist in Odia Literature.

Upendra Bhanja was also criticised for his obscure words. Once a modern poet Guru Prasad (See Odia literature) wrote "Upendra Bhanja means a woman and a Dictionary". Though he was criticised by the modernists, he can be comparable with Kalidas in using simile (Upama) in his kabyas. But above all, the role of Upendra Bhanja can not be denied during the Riti Yuga period of Odia literature.

See also

 Odia language
 List of Odia writers

References

External links
 orissadiary.com: Upendra Bhanja

Year of birth uncertain
1740 deaths
Odia people
People from Ganjam district
Indian male poets
Poets from Odisha
Odia-language writers
Odia-language poets
Odissi music composers
17th-century Indian poets